Jeanne Boutbien (born 8 April 1999) is a French-Senegalese swimmer. She competed in the women's 100 metre freestyle event at the 2017 World Aquatics Championships.

Career
In 2019, she represented Senegal at the 2019 World Aquatics Championships held in Gwangju, South Korea. She competed in the women's 50 metre freestyle and women's 100 metre freestyle events. In both events she did not advance to compete in the semi-finals. She also competed in two mixed relay events, without winning a medal. In 2019, she also represented Senegal at the 2019 African Games held in Rabat, Morocco. She competed in both the women's 50 metre freestyle and women's 100 metre freestyle events.

She competed in the women's 100 metre freestyle event at the 2020 Summer Olympics.

Personal life
She was born in Dakar to French parents from Trégunc, and obtained Senegalese citizenship in 2016.

References

External links
 

1999 births
Living people
Footballers from Dakar
Senegalese people of French descent
French female freestyle swimmers
Swimmers at the 2019 African Games
Senegalese female freestyle swimmers
African Games competitors for Senegal
Swimmers at the 2020 Summer Olympics
Olympic swimmers of Senegal
Naturalized citizens of Senegal